Halim Ebo (born 3 June 1989), also known as , Abd Elhalim Mohamed Abou and Abou Abd Elahim, is an Egyptian indoor volleyball player. With his club Al-Ahly Sporting Club he competed at the 2011 FIVB Volleyball Men's Club World Championship. Since 2013 he is a member of the Egypt men's national volleyball team. He competed at the 2016 Summer Olympics and 2014 World Championships and 2015 FIVB Volleyball Men's World Cup

Sporting achievements

Clubs 

 Al Ahly SC  :

-  4 × Egyptian Volleyball League : 2010/11, 2012/13, 2013/14, 2017/18.

-  4 × Egyptian Volleyball Cup : 2010/11, 2012/13, 2013/14, 2017/18.

-  4 × African Clubs Championship (volleyball) : 2015 - 2017 - 2018 - 2022 .

National team

  2 × Men's African Volleyball Championship : 2013-2015
  2 × Arab Games : 2014, 2016

Individually
 Best server at 2015 Men's African Volleyball Championship
 Best blocker at 2017 African volleyball clubs championship

References

External links
 http://www.fivb.org/viewHeadlines.asp?No=50387&Language=en
 http://worldleague.2016.fivb.com/en/group2/teams/egy-egypt/players/abd-elhalim-mohamed-abou?id=52036
 Abd Elhalim Mohamed Abou at FIVB.org
 

1989 births
Egyptian men's volleyball players
Al Ahly (men's volleyball) players
Living people
Olympic volleyball players of Egypt
Place of birth missing (living people)
Volleyball players at the 2016 Summer Olympics